Barbara Sattler may refer to:
 Barbara Sattler-Kovacevic (born 1948), Austrian retired slalom canoeist
 Barbara Sattler (philosopher), British philosopher